Smochevo Cove (‘Zaliv Smochevo’ \'za-liv 'smo-che-vo\) is the 1.6 km wide cove on the southeast side of Osmar Strait indenting for 850 m the northwest coast of Low Island in the South Shetland Islands, Antarctica.  Entered south of Cape Wallace, Zebil Island and Glumche Island, and north of Fernandez Point.

The cove is named after the settlement of Smochevo in Western Bulgaria.

Location
British mapping in 2009.

Maps
 South Shetland Islands: Smith and Low Islands. Scale 1:150000 topographic map No. 13677. British Antarctic Survey, 2009.
 Antarctic Digital Database (ADD). Scale 1:250000 topographic map of Antarctica. Scientific Committee on Antarctic Research (SCAR). Since 1993, regularly upgraded and updated.

References
 Smochevo Cove. SCAR Composite Antarctic Gazetteer.
 Bulgarian Antarctic Gazetteer. Antarctic Place-names Commission. (details in Bulgarian, basic data in English)

External links
 Smochevo Cove. Copernix satellite image

Coves of the South Shetland Islands
Bulgaria and the Antarctic